Alvaro Banchi (23 April 1925 – 9 September 1997) was an Italian rower. He competed in the men's coxless pair event at the 1956 Summer Olympics.

References

External links
 

1925 births
1997 deaths
Italian male rowers
Olympic rowers of Italy
Rowers at the 1956 Summer Olympics
Place of birth missing